Lutfar Rahman Chowdhury is a Jatiya Party (Ershad) politician and the former Member of Parliament of Gaibandha-4.

Career
Chowdhury was elected to parliament from Gaibandha-4 as a Jatiya Party candidate in 1986, 1991, and 1996.

References

Jatiya Party politicians
Living people
3rd Jatiya Sangsad members
5th Jatiya Sangsad members
6th Jatiya Sangsad members
7th Jatiya Sangsad members
Year of birth missing (living people)